Maly Sanchur is a rural locality (a village) in Dmitriyevogorskoye Rural Settlement, Melenkovsky District, Vladimir Oblast, Russia. The population was 198 as of 2010.

Geography 
Maly Sanchur is located 32 km southeast of Melenki (the district's administrative centre) by road. Bolshoy Sanchur is the nearest rural locality.

References 

Rural localities in Melenkovsky District